Maramfest is an annual music and cultural festival held in Manipur, founded by John Hingkung. It usually takes place in December/January. The festival is owned and managed by Sevendiary.com. In 2012, the line-up included two British Metal bands Bloodshot Dawn and Xerath headlining the festival.

Maramfest 2009
The first Maramfest was held on 16 January 2009 at Helipad Ground, Maram Centre,. The line-up settled into a pattern of progressive rock, country and hard rock. Renowned local acts like Jiangam, Scarf, Psiikouna, Young Maraluiths and Over the Bridge performed in front of thousands of home fans.

Maramfest 2012
After a hiatus of two years, the 2nd Edition of Maramfest 2012 featured Bloodshot Dawn (UK), Xerath (UK)  and Recycle (Imphal) on the festival bill, held at Mini Stadium, Senapati in Manipur.

Official compilation albums
An official Maramfest compilation CD is released annually to coincide with the start of the festival. The compilation includes songs by numerous artists performing on the festival that year and also the best songs released by Maram artistes that year.

External links
 www.reinventclock.com

References

^ reference 1
^ reference 2
^ reference 3

Music festivals in India
Rock festivals in India
Festivals in Manipur
Music festivals established in 2009